"Start Me Up" is a 1992 single released by American R&B and hip-hop group Salt-N-Pepa. The song is included in the 1992 American film, Stay Tuned. It was later included on Salt-N-Pepa's 1999 album, The Best of Salt-N-Pepa.

Track listing
 CD Maxi 
 Start Me Up  (Radio Edit)  - 3:39	
 Start Me Up  (Alternative Edit)  - 3:58	
 Start Me Up  (Original Version)  - 3:48	
 Start Me Up  (Club Version)  - 5:44
 Start Me Up  (DJ's Choice)  - 4:28

Charts

References

1992 singles
Salt-N-Pepa songs
1992 songs
 London Records singles
Songs written by Hurby Azor